D. A. (Doris A.) Dirks is a Canadian activist, instructor, and author.

Early life and education

Born in Quebec of German immigrant parents, Dirks grew up in Calgary, Alberta. Dirks received a B.A. in art history and M.A. in history from the University of Calgary, and an M.A. in higher education and student affairs and Ph.D. in educational leadership from Western Michigan University.

Career

Dirks is contract faculty in the Departments of General Education and Humanities at Mount Royal University in Calgary. They primarily teach courses that examine diverse genders, sexualities, and identities. D.A. was previously a senior academic planner at the University of Wisconsin System Administration; the coordinator of student organizations for social justice and LGBT Resource Center at Northwestern University; and the coordinator of LBGT Student Services at Western Michigan University.
Dirks is the co-author with Patricia A. Relf of To Offer Compassion: A History of the Clergy Consultation Service on Abortion (Madison, WI: University of Wisconsin Press, 2017).

References

Canadian activists
University of Calgary alumni
Western Michigan University alumni